The Farrar LSG-1 Bird Flight Machine is an American, high-wing, V-tailed, single-seat, experimental research glider that was designed and built by Demetrius F. Farrar Jr. in 1969 for exploring aspects of bird flight.

Design and development
The LSG-1 was specially designed by Farrar for research purposes as part of a Vanderbilt University project into how birds fly and was supported by  the US National Science Foundation.

The aircraft is of mixed construction. The fuselage is made from a sandwich of balsa and fiberglass, while the wing is of wood and Kevlar, built on an aluminium spar. Its  span wing employs an unusual Wortmann FX 05-H-126 airfoil, which was originally designed for helicopter use. The LSG-1 has no glidepath control devices, such as dive brakes, making it a challenge to land.

Only one LSG-1 was built and it was registered with the US Federal Aviation Administration in the Experimental - Amateur-built category.

Operational history
The aircraft was used to explore bird exploitation of microlift under supervision of Gary Osoba. In August 2011, 42 years after it was completed, the aircraft was still on the FAA aircraft register and still owned by the designer. Its registration expired and was cancelled on 29 April 2013 and it is unknown if the aircraft still exists or not.

Operators
Vanderbilt University

Specifications (LSG-1)

See also

References

1960s United States sailplanes
Homebuilt aircraft
V-tail aircraft